

See also 
 United States House of Representatives elections, 1802 and 1803
 List of United States representatives from Rhode Island

Notes 

1802
Rhode Island
United States House of Representatives